Bryan William Yuile (born 29 October 1941) is a retired cricketer who played 17 Test matches for New Zealand in the 1960s.  He played first-class cricket from 1959 to 1972, until his religious objection to playing on Sundays led to the end of his career.

Career
Yuile went to school at Palmerston North Boys' High School. He was a left-arm spin bowler and middle-to-lower-order batsman. He played for Central Districts from 1959–60 to 1971–72, and toured South Africa in 1961–62 and England, India and Pakistan in 1965 and 1969 with the New Zealand team.

In 1962–63 he took 7 for 36 against Otago. He made his Test debut against England in the First Test in Auckland later that season, taking the wicket of Ted Dexter and top-scoring for New Zealand with 64 in the first innings, which remained his highest Test score. His best Test figures came in the Second Test against Pakistan in Auckland in 1964–65, when he dismissed four of the first five batsmen and finished with 4 for 43 off 54 overs.

In 1965–66 he took 9 for 100 for Central Districts against Canterbury. The previous season he had taken 3 for 33 and 7 for 54 against Northern Districts. His highest first-class score and only century was 146 against Canterbury in 1967–68 (he also took 6 for 68 and 1 for 13 in the same match).

In 1966–67 in the four-match series against the visiting Australians he took 15 wickets at 22.13 and made 162 runs at 40.50. In the first match, when New Zealand beat an Australian team for the first time, he took 5 for 62 and 2 for 57 (match figures of 69–34–119–7) and made 38 and 5 not out.

In 1969 he headed the batting averages on the New Zealand tour of England with 383 runs at 63.83, but was not selected for any of the Tests, in which Hedley Howarth carried the spin attack.

Along with his teammates on the 1969 tour Bruce Murray and Vic Pollard he would not play cricket on Sundays for religious reasons. With the introduction of Sunday play in the late 1960s and early 1970s, his career was consequently curtailed.

He worked as a social worker in Wairoa in the Hawke's Bay Region.

References

External links
 

1941 births
Living people
Cricketers from Palmerston North
Central Districts cricketers
Canterbury cricketers
New Zealand cricketers
New Zealand Test cricketers
People educated at Palmerston North Boys' High School
D. H. Robins' XI cricketers
North Island cricketers